Simone Gariboldi (born 16 July 1987) is an Italian male middle distance runner who won two national titles at senior level. He participated at the 2014 IAAF World Half Marathon Championships.

Biography
Gariboldi won two medals with the Italian team at the European Cross Country Championships at youth level (2006, 2008). He also participated at two editions of the IAAF World Cross Country Championships (2005, 2006) at individual junior level.

Achievements

National titles
He won two national championships at individual senior level.
Italian Athletics Championships
10,000 metres: 2011
Italian Indoor Athletics Championships
3000 metres: 2012

References

External links
 

1987 births
Living people
Italian male middle-distance runners
Italian male cross country runners
Athletics competitors of Fiamme Oro